Wallaby Peak is a  mountain summit located on the boundary line of the Lake Chelan-Sawtooth Wilderness, in Okanogan County, Washington. The mountain is part of the Methow Mountains, which are a subset of the Cascade Range. Wallaby Peak is situated on Kangaroo Ridge which is approximately two miles east and within view of Washington Pass. Its nearest higher peak is Big Kangaroo,  to the north. Precipitation runoff from the peak drains into Early Winters Creek, Cedar Creek, and North Fork Twisp River, all of which are tributaries of the Methow River.

Climate

Most weather fronts originate in the Pacific Ocean, and travel northeast toward the Cascade Mountains. As fronts approach the North Cascades, they are forced upward (Orographic lift) by the peaks of the Cascade Range, causing them to drop their moisture in the form of rain or snowfall onto the Cascades. As a result, the west side of the North Cascades experiences high precipitation, especially during the winter months in the form of snowfall. During winter months, weather is usually cloudy, but, due to high pressure systems over the Pacific Ocean that intensify during summer months, there is often little or no cloud cover during the summer. Because of maritime influence, snow tends to be wet and heavy, resulting in avalanche danger.

Geology
The North Cascades features some of the most rugged topography in the Cascade Range with craggy peaks, ridges, and deep glacial valleys. Geological events occurring many years ago created the diverse topography and drastic elevation changes over the Cascade Range leading to the various climate differences. These climate differences lead to vegetation variety defining the ecoregions in this area. The history of the formation of the Cascade Mountains dates back millions of years ago to the late Eocene Epoch. With the North American Plate overriding the Pacific Plate, episodes of volcanic igneous activity persisted.  In addition, small fragments of the oceanic and continental lithosphere called terranes created the North Cascades about 50 million years ago. Wallaby Peak is located in the Golden Horn batholith and composed of granite like many of the peaks in the Washington Pass area.

During the Pleistocene period dating back over two million years ago, glaciation advancing and retreating repeatedly scoured the landscape leaving deposits of rock debris. The "U"-shaped cross section of the river valleys are a result of recent glaciation. Uplift and faulting in combination with glaciation have been the dominant processes which have created the tall peaks and deep valleys of the North Cascades area.

See also

 List of Highest Mountain Peaks in Washington
 Geography of the North Cascades
 Geology of the Pacific Northwest

References

Gallery

External links

 Wallaby Peak summit view: YouTube
 National Weather Service: Wallaby Peak weather forecast

Mountains of Washington (state)
Mountains of Okanogan County, Washington
North Cascades
Cascade Range
North American 2000 m summits